James Reidy (1890 – 7 December 1963) was an Irish politician. He was first elected to Dáil Éireann as a Cumann na nGaedheal Teachta Dála (TD) for the Limerick constituency at the 1932 general election. He was re-elected at the 1933 general election but lost his seat at the 1937 general election. 

At the 1938 general election, he was elected as a Fine Gael TD. He was re-elected at each subsequent general election until he lost his seat at the 1954 general election. He was nominated by the Taoiseach to the 8th Seanad in 1954.

References

1890 births
1963 deaths
Cumann na nGaedheal TDs
Fine Gael TDs
Members of the 7th Dáil
Members of the 8th Dáil
Members of the 10th Dáil
Members of the 11th Dáil
Members of the 12th Dáil
Members of the 13th Dáil
Members of the 14th Dáil
Members of the 8th Seanad
Politicians from County Limerick
Nominated members of Seanad Éireann
Fine Gael senators